Coelioxys menthae is a species of bee in the family Megachilidae.

References

Further reading

 

menthae
Articles created by Qbugbot
Insects described in 1897